Hermann Dieter (born 14 September 1879, date of death unknown) was a German architect. His work was part of the architecture event in the art competition at the 1928 Summer Olympics.

References

1879 births
Year of death missing
20th-century German architects
Olympic competitors in art competitions
Architects from Darmstadt